Hokkaidō 2nd district (北海道第2区, Hokkai-dō dai-ni-ku) was an SNTV four-member electoral district for the House of Representatives, the lower house of the National Diet of Japan, between 1947 and 1996, last used in the lower house election of 1993. Located in the prefecture (-dō) of Hokkaidō, it consisted (as of 1993) of the cities (-shi) of Asahikawa, Rumoi, Wakkanai, Shibetsu, Nayoro, Furano and all other municipalities in the subprefectures (-shichō) Kamikawa, Sōya and Rumoi. With the return to single-member districts in the 1990s electoral reform, the district became the 7th district. In 2003 the 7th district was abolished and the area that was once the 2nd district was divided amongst the 6th, 10th and 12th districts of Hokkaidō.

List of representatives (incomplete)
Yōichi Kawaguchi, elected 1947, 1949 (Japanese Farmers Party→New Farmers Party→Progressive/Reform Party [Kaishintō]→Japanese Socialist Party (right wing))
Hideyo Sasaki, 1947, 1949, 1952, 1955, 1960, 1963, 1967, 1969, 1972 (Democratic Party→Democratic Liberal Party→Liberal Party→Liberal Democratic Party)
Kōtarō Bandō, 1947 (Liberal Party→Democratic Party)
Shūtarō Matsuura, 1952, 1953, 1955, 1958, 1960, 1963, 1967, 1969, 1972 (Progressive/Reform Party [Kaishintō]→Japanese Democratic Party→Liberal Democratic Party)
Mitsugu Haga 1952, 1953, 1955, 1958, 1960, 1963, 1967, 1969, 1972, 1976, 1979 (Japanese Socialist Party (left wing)→Japanese Socialist Party [Nihon Shakaitō, self-chosen name for English-speaking foreigners in the 1990s: Social Democratic Party, not to be confused with the Social Democratic Party (Shakaiminshutō) that existed in the 1950s as a small breakaway from the Socialist Party or with the Social Democratic Party (Shakaiminshutō), the much smaller successor of the JSP since 1996])
Yoshinori Yasui 1958, 1960, 1963, 1967, 1969, 1972, 1976, 1979, 1980, 1983, 1986 (Japanese Socialist Party)
Masanori Kawata, 1976, 1980, 1986 (Liberal Democratic Party)
Shigetoshi Murakami, 1976, 1979, 1983 (Liberal Democratic Party)
Yoshiteru Uekusa, 1979, 1980, 1983, 1986, 1990 (Liberal Democratic Party)
Hidenori Sasaki, 1990, 1993 (Japanese Socialist Party)
Eikō Kaneta, 1993 (Liberal Democratic Party)
Kozo Igarashi, Social Democratic Party, 1980, 1983, 1986, 1990, 1993
Hiroshi Imazu, Liberal Democratic Party, 1990, 1993

Election results (incomplete)
1993 Japanese general election, turnout 69.9%
Elected: Hiroshi Imazu (incumbent), Liberal Democratic Party (LDP), 84,315 votes, 22.1%
Elected: Kōzō Igarashi (incumbent), Japanese Socialist Party (JSP), 75,902 votes, 19.9%
Elected: Hidenori Sasaki (incumbent), JSP, 70,582 votes, 18.5%
Elected: Eikō Kaneta, LDP, 68,593 votes, 17.9%
Yoshiteru Uekusa (incumbent), LDP, 62,842 votes, 16.4%
Hidenori Endō (?, 遠藤英徳), Japanese Communist Party (JCP), 20,059 votes, 5.2%
1990 Japanese general election, turnout, 77.9%
Elected: Hidenori Sasaki, JSP, 108,962 votes, 25.6%
Elected: Kōzō Igarashi (incumbent), JSP, 84,953 votes, 20.0%
Elected: Hiroshi Imazu, LDP, 79,806 votes, 18.7%
Elected: Yoshiteru Uekusa (incumbent), LDP, 72,207 votes, 17.0%
Eikō Kaneta, LDP, 53,219 votes, 12.5%
Kōshirō Sawada (?, 沢田耕七郎), JCP, 26,654 votes, 6.3%
1986 Japanese general election, turnout 79.6%
Elected: Masanori Kawata (former member), LDP, 94,964 votes, 22.1%
Elected: Kōzō Igarashi (incumbent), JSP, 82,068 votes, 19.1%
Elected: Yoshinori Yasui (incumbent), JSP, 79,493 votes, 18.5%
Elected: Yoshiteru Uekusa (incumbent), LDP, 74,523 votes, 17.3%
Shigetoshi Murakami (incumbent), LDP, 73,296 votes, 17.0%
Kōshirō Sawada (?), JCP, 16,394 votes, 3.8%
Kunio Sasaki, independent, 9,169 votes, 2.1%
1983 Japanese general election
Kozo Igarashi, Social Democratic Party, 81,205 votes
Japanese Communist Party, 14,768 votes
1980 Japanese general election
Kozo Igarashi, Social Democratic Party, 100,311 votes
Japanese Communist Party, 15,378 votes
1979 Japanese general election
Japanese Communist Party, 21,693 votes
1976 Japanese general election
Japanese Communist Party, 31,223 votes
independent, 1,572 votes
1972 Japanese general election
independent, 26,983 votes
Japanese Communist Party, 24,964 votes
1969 Japanese general election
Japanese Communist Party, 25,256 votes
1967 Japanese general election
Japanese Communist Party, 22,322 votes
1963 Japanese general election
Japanese Communist Party, 6,976 votes
1960 Japanese general election
Japanese Communist Party, 5,534 votes
1958 Japanese general election
Japanese Communist Party, 6,675 votes
1955 Japanese general election
Japanese Communist Party, 7,685 votes
1953 Japanese general election
independent, 26,228 votes
Japanese Communist Party, 5,543 votes
1952 Japanese general election
independent, 27,466 votes
Japanese Communist Party, 6,139 votes
1949 Japanese general election
Japanese Communist Party, 11,063 votes
1947 Japanese general election
Japanese Communist Party, 3,271 votes
independent, 3,012 votes

Politics of Hokkaido
History of Hokkaido
Districts of the House of Representatives (Japan)